Igor Shubin (December 20, 1955, Perm) is a Russian political figure, former mayor of Perm, deputy of the 7th and 8th State Dumas. 

From 1974 to 1977, Shubin served at the Soviet Navy. From 1983 to 1992, he worked at the district executive committee of the Dzerzhinsky City District. In 1990, he became the deputy of the Perm City Council of People's Deputies. From 1992 to 1994, he headed the administration of the Dzerzhinsky City District. From 1994 to 2001, Shubin was the Deputy Governor of Perm Krai. From 2001 to 2005, he was the deputy of the Legislative Assembly of Perm Oblast of the 3rd convocation. He left the post in 2005 to become the mayor of Perm. From 2011 to 2012, he was the deputy of the Legislative Assembly of Perm Krai of the 2nd convocation. From 2012 to 2016, he was a member of the Federation Council. In 2016, he was elected deputy of the 7th State Duma. Since September 2021, he has served as deputy of the 8th State Duma

On May 22, 2018, the Perm City Duma discussed the opportunity to give Shubin a title of an Honorary Citizen. However, out of 24 deputies, the majority either voted against or abstained from voting.

Awards  
 Order of Friendship

References

1955 births
Living people
United Russia politicians
21st-century Russian politicians
Eighth convocation members of the State Duma (Russian Federation)
Seventh convocation members of the State Duma (Russian Federation)
Members of the Federation Council of Russia (after 2000)